Nudity in American television is a controversial topic. Aside from a few exceptions, nudity in the United States has traditionally not been shown on terrestrial television. On the other hand, cable television has been much less constrained as far as nudity is concerned.

History
The Public Broadcasting Service, which features nudity in anthropological documentaries as well as some films, was the first network to display national programming that featured frontal female nudity on television. In 1975 (with a rerun in 1986), the PBS National Geographic special Man: The Incredible Machine looked into parts of the human body and included in its opening scenes a fully nude woman in an artist's model pose; probably less for this than the innovative micro- and interior cinematography, this was for more than half a decade the most popular single program broadcast on the network.

In 1973, an episode of M*A*S*H contained one of the first depictions of nudity in prime time TV in the United States-—a brief glimpse of Gary Burghoff's buttocks as Radar's towel slips off as he runs into the shower tent to escape from the sniper fire.

The special-event miniseries, Roots on ABC, featured some partial nudity of its cast, usually fleetingly, but more so than other commercial network programming in the United States in the 1970s.

In 1985, the two-night adaptation of Ken Follett's The Key to Rebecca, shown on WPIX Channel 11 in New York City on April 29 and May 9, had non-pixelated toplessness from both of its female stars, Season Hubley and Lina Raymond.

Throughout the United States, many metropolitan areas had independent television stations that were not affiliated with any of the national networks and showed programming only to people within their limited broadcast range. During the 1980s, many of these stations experimented with content containing frontal female nudity in movies during prime time. KTLA in Los Angeles, for example, showed an unedited version of the Academy Award-winning One Flew Over the Cuckoo's Nest, which featured fully exposed female breasts, between 7:30 and 11 p.m. The channel began the time slot with a video of director Miloš Forman stating that the film was too controversial to be allowed a faithful television broadcast (NBC's earlier broadcast had cut the film to fit the two hours format with commercials), but that KTLA believed that the culture had changed such that a complete broadcast would be tolerated and appreciated. Then, it was followed by a disclaimer that was repeated after each commercial break.

KTVU in the San Francisco Bay Area regularly showed uncensored films that contained nudity, such as Magnum Force (1973, with uncredited Suzanne Somers appearing topless in a pool scene), Big Bad Mama (1974, starring Angie Dickinson with full frontal nudity), and Walkabout (1971, which contained full frontal nudity in a nude bathing scene with then–teenage actress Jenny Agutter).

A number of stations in the mid 1980s even went so far as to run promotions during which they would show a series of movies known for nudity in an attempt to get higher ratings for the week. In nearly all of these films, the nudity was restricted to showing exposed buttocks and female breasts.

By the end of the 1980s, most of these stations had  
received  numerous complaints about such nudity and these broadcasts eventually stopped. Additionally, some stations became Fox affiliates and were no longer able to make independent programming decisions during prime time.

From the early 1990s until the early 2000s, some prime time series (such as ABC's NYPD Blue and Once and Again, CBS's CSI: Crime Scene Investigation and Chicago Hope  and Fox's John Doe) experimented with nudity. NYPD Blue is noteworthy for featuring nudity in the context of people engaging in sexual activity. While fully exposed female breasts were never shown, the show often depicted full back nudity of men and women.

In 1997, NBC broadcast an unedited version of Steven Spielberg's Holocaust film Schindler's List in prime time. The film features brief full-frontal nudity of both sexes in non-sexual contexts. Then-Congressman Tom Coburn criticized NBC's airing of the film for its nudity, violence and profanity. Both Democrats and Coburn's fellow Republicans criticized Coburn for his reaction, and defended the film and NBC's choice to air it in full. Coburn subsequently apologized for his reaction.

In 2013, Buying Naked premiered on TLC that the real estate agent Jackie Youngblood shows homes in clothing optional communities to house-hunting nudists.

In 2014, Dating Naked is an American reality series dating game show shown on VH1 the series debuted in July 2014, and ran through 2016.

Current status
After Justin Timberlake exposed Janet Jackson's breast during a live performance at the 2004 Super Bowl halftime show the Federal Communications Commission (FCC) tightened its indecency rules due to public pressure.

As a consequence of the public and media reaction to the incident, major networks edited some of their shows. CBS removed a shot of a naked man from Without a Trace, while NBC deleted a two-second shot of an elderly woman's breast from ER. Subsequently, prime time television networks became more reluctant to show even non-explicit nudity in their TV shows. In the current climate, nudity is almost unknown on any broadcast television show — with the exception being animated series such as The Simpsons and Family Guy (which spoofed the conservative phase of American television in the episode "PTV").

Cable television, on the other hand, is not bound by FCC rules and can show whatever material their executives consider suitable. With some exceptions, while cable channels that rely on advertising still do not show nudity during prime time, nudity is often shown on premium cable channels such as Showtime, HBO and Turner Classic Movies (TCM). FX is one of the few commercial–dependent cable channels that features nudity in its programming (notably the controversial Nip/Tuck and American Horror Story). SundanceTV will allow nudity. Discovery and other documentary-related channels may show nudity in a journalistic context, such as that of indigenous peoples.

Naked and Afraid is an American reality series shown on the Discovery Channel. The fifth season premiered on March 13, 2016. Modelled on Dutch show Adam Zkt. Eva, the show matches up heterosexual contestants who are nude most of the time. The genitals of all participants along with the female breasts, and occasionally the buttocks, are blurred out. Each episode chronicles the lives of two survivalists (one female, one male) who meet for the first time and are given the task of surviving a stay in the wilderness naked for 21 days. The spin-off reality show Naked and Afraid XL is also on the Discovery Channel. Each season in the episodes that more survivalist(s) are giving the task of surviving the wilderness for 40 days. Again, the contestants' crotch area and the women's breasts are blurred out.

While nudity practically disappeared from network television, a Kaiser Family Foundation study of sex on television released in November 2005 showed that TV characters are having sex twice as often as they were in 1998. The study examined more than 1,000 hours of programming.

In recent years, a number of cable stations in the United States have begun to air R-rated movies uncensored. They include Deadpool and The Wolf of Wall Street airing on FX.

See also
 Depictions of nudity
 Nudity and sexuality
 Nudity in film
 Nudity in music videos
 Sex in advertising
 Sex in film
 Sex and sexuality in speculative fiction
 Super Bowl XXXVIII halftime show controversy
 Wardrobe malfunction

References

External links
 "American TV pushes nudity off the schedule", Taipei Times, February 16, 2004
 Nudity on television (TV Acres)
 "Nudity on Broadcast Television"
 Randy Cassingham's This is True: "Super Bowl Bodice Ripper"

Television in the United States
Nudity in television